Anatoly Viktorovich Utkin (1943 – 12 September 1975) was a Soviet serial killer, convicted for the killing of nine people in Ulyanovsk Oblast and Penza Oblast between 1968 and 1973.

Background
Utkin was born in 1943, while his father Viktor was serving in World War II. When his father found his future mother pregnant, he thought that she committed an adultery, and abandoned the future child. Utkin's mother attempted to get rid of him while pregnant, but she failed. Despite this background, Utkin experienced nothing special during his early years. He attended a vocational school and worked as a driver for the Soviet Army.

Murders
On 31 March 1968 Utkin committed his first murder in Barysh, Ulyanovsk Oblast, when he killed a 14-year-old girl and stole her watch. The body of the girl was found two months later, 300 kilometres from where she was killed. Three months later on 27 June, Utkin raped and killed a 17-year-old girl, and on 25 September killed a 13-year-old in Penza Oblast. On 8 October, Utkin attempted to kill another girl but she fought him off and survived. On 28 November Utkin killed a 10-year-old girl in Ulyanovsk, taking her left sock, and 28 May 1969 he killed another woman in the city. In August 1969 Utkin was convicted for robbery and sentenced to three years in prison.

Utkin was released from prison in October 1972, and shortly afterwards attempted to rape and murder a woman in Barysh, but the victim managed to escape. On 6 December, Utkin killed his only male victim, stealing his money and dumping the body in a ditch. On 15 December, Utkin killed a woman who hitchhiked with him from an airport in Ulyanovsk.

Arrest and conviction
On 8 February 1973, Utkin attempted to commit a robbery at a textile factory, killing a cashier. After failing to open the safe containing the worker's salaries using the cashier's keys, he set fire to the building with a bucket of diesel fuel. Utkin accidentally left behind the metal bucket which had his name stamped on it, and it was discovered the next day by the police investigating the fire. Utkin was arrested at his home by Inspector Anwar Melnikov, where he attempted to resist arrest, and was taken into custody. In 1974, Utkin was charged with nine murders, theft and robbery. Judge Vitaly Shorin found Utkin guilty on all counts, and sentenced him to death.

On 12 September 1975, Utkin was executed.

See also
 List of Russian serial killers

References

1943 births
1975 deaths
20th-century executions by Russia
20th-century Russian criminals
Child sexual abuse in the Soviet Union
Executed Russian people
Executed Soviet serial killers
Male serial killers
People convicted of murder by Russia
People convicted of murder by the Soviet Union
People executed by the Soviet Union by firearm
Russian people convicted of murder
Russian people executed by the Soviet Union
Russian rapists
Russian robbers
Russian serial killers
Soviet murderers of children
Soviet people convicted of murder
Soviet rapists
Thieves
Violence against women in Russia